Mario Edgardo Aguilar Posadas (born July 31, 1984 in Metapán) is a Salvadoran footballer who currently plays for Isidro Metapán in the Primera División de Fútbol de El Salvador.

Club career
A holding midfielder or central defender, Aguilar has played his entire football career for his hometown club Isidro Metapán.

International career
Aguilar made his debut for El Salvador as a late substitute in an October 2008 FIFA World Cup qualification match against Haiti which proved to be his only international up until October 2010.

External links
Player profile - Isidro Metapán official website
 

1984 births
Living people
People from Santa Ana Department
Salvadoran footballers
El Salvador international footballers
A.D. Isidro Metapán footballers
Association football midfielders